Bath Charter Township is a charter township of Clinton County in the U.S. state of Michigan. As of the 2010 census, the township population was 11,598, which is a large increase from 7,541 at the 2000 census.  It is situated directly north of the city of East Lansing.

Communities
 Bath is an unincorporated community and census-designated place located within the western portion of the township.

History 

Bath Township was originally organized in 1839 as Ossowa Township, having been split from DeWitt Township by an act of the governor.  It was renamed Bath Township in 1843 after Bath, New York.

Park Lake at the southern edge of the township was the source of the Park Lake Trail, an important Native American trailway that intersected the Okemah Trail in what later became the city of East Lansing, Michigan. Park Lake developed into a regional recreation destination for the growing Lansing population after the state capitol relocated to Lansing in 1847 and the Michigan Agricultural College was established in East Lansing, Michigan in 1855. By the early 1900s Park Lake was surrounded by summer camps affiliated with various churches and associations as well as seasonal cabins and lodges. The most ambitious of these was the Park Lake Resort which featured a large dance pavilion built over the water on pilings. The Park Lake Dance Pavilion served as an entertainment venue playing host to many famous acts such as Tommy Dorsey until it burned in the 1930s. Years of decline followed and Park Lake never regained its former popularity.

Bath Township was the scene of the Bath School bombing, which is the deadliest act of mass murder in a school in United States history. It claimed more than three times as many victims as the Columbine High School massacre and twice as many victims as the Virginia Tech and the Sandy Hook Elementary School shootings.

Geography

Demographics

2010 census
At the 2010 census there were 11,598 people in 4,697 households, including 2,596 families, in the township. The racial makeup of the township was 87.5% White, 5.2% African American, 0.4% Native American, 3.6% Asian, 0.0% Pacific Islander, 1.0% from other races, and 2.3% from two or more races. Hispanic or Latino of any race were 3.4%.

2000 census
Of the 2,799 households 37.1% had children under the age of 18 living with them, 60.6% were married couples living together, 9.8% had a female householder with no husband present, and 25.8% were non-families. 19.5% of households were one person and 4.4% were one person aged 65 or older.  The average household size was 2.68 and the average family size was 3.10.

The age distribution was 28.2% under the age of 18, 6.8% from 18 to 24, 32.1% from 25 to 44, 25.0% from 45 to 64, and 7.9% 65 or older.  The median age was 36 years. For every 100 females, there were 98.4 males.  For every 100 females age 18 and over, there were 98.2 males.

The median household income was $53,881 and the median family income was $58,825. Males had a median income of $43,548 versus $31,056 for females. The per capita income for the township was $24,675.  About 3.8% of families and 4.5% of the population were below the poverty line, including 3.8% of those under age 18 and 7.8% of those age 65 or over.

Education
School districts serving township residents:
Bath Community Schools
East Lansing Public Schools
Haslett Public Schools
Laingsburg Community Schools

References

External links
Official website of Bath Charter Township

 
Townships in Clinton County, Michigan
Charter townships in Michigan
Lansing–East Lansing metropolitan area
Populated places established in 1826
1826 establishments in Michigan Territory